The Connacht Senior Club Hurling Championship was an annual hurling tournament played between the senior hurling clubs in Connacht contested from 1970 until 2007 when it was discontinued due to a lack of meaningful opposition for the Galway champions. The Galway champions now qualify directly for the All-Ireland Senior Club Hurling Championship semi-final.

Throughout the competition's existence the Galway champions automatically qualified for the final. In 2007, the competition's final year, this competition was won by Portumna from Galway. The competition had long since become a formality for the Galway teams.

The Mayo and Roscommon champions now compete in the Connacht Intermediate Club Hurling Championship. Sligo and Leitrim champions participate in the Connacht Junior Club Hurling Championship, again with the Galway side entering the competition at the final stage.

History

Given traditional lack of meaningful competition for Galway within the province, the competition was, save for a handful of occasions, a formality with one-sided games being the norm. Thus it was not taken seriously by many when considered in relation to the All-Ireland stage. While the competition was dominated by the Galway sides throughout its history, the title left the county three times in all, with Roscommon providing the winners on these occasions with Four Roads winning two titles in 1977 and 1988, while Tremane won their sole title in 1976. Tremane won their title courtesy of a shock win over Kiltormer on a scoreline of 2-7 to 1-9, and went on to play the well renowned Glen Rovers of Cork in the All-Ireland semi final.

Four Roads were awarded the 1977 championship as a result of Galway champions Kiltormer being handed a suspension by the Galway County Board for incidents which took place match involving the club when they were due to play in the decider. Four Roads went on to represent Connacht in that years All-Ireland semi final. Their second and final victory, won on the field of play, was a much more memorable occasion as the title was wrestled from the Galway champions Abbeyknockmoy at a time when Galway hurling was riding the crest of a wave, having just won back to back All-Ireland hurling titles in 1988. Like their previous All-Ireland semi final appearance, they were up against Wexford opposition, this time in the form of Buffers Alley, but lost out on a scoreline of 2-19 to 0-9.

Mayo side Toureen reached the final on numerous occasions, most recently in 1999 when they lost to eventual All-Ireland champions Athenry, while Ballina and Ballyhaunis made sole appearances for Mayo at the final stage. No Sligo or Leitrim side competed in a final throughout the competition's existence.

Teams

Roll of Honour

Wins by County

List of Finals

Records and statistics

By decade 

The most successful team of each decade, judged by number of Connacht Championship titles, is as follows:

 1970s: 3 each for Castlegar (1972-73-79) and Ardrahan (1974-75-78)
 1980s: 2 each for Sarsfields (1980–89) and Gort (1981–83)
 1990s: 4 each for Sarsfields (1992-93-95-97) and Athenry (1994-96-98-99)
 2000s: 3 each for Athenry (2000-02-04) and Portumna (2003-05-07)

Gaps 

Top three longest gaps between successive championship titles:

 11 years: Four Roads (1977-1988)
 9 years: Sarsfields (1980-1989)
 8 years: Kiltormer (1982-1990)

Top scorers

Finals

References

1